Krzysztof Kąkolewski (16 March 1930 – 24 May 2015) was a Polish book author, life-long scholar, investigative journalist considered the pillar of the Polish school of reportage, as well as dramatist and screenwriter. He graduated from the Faculty of Journalism in the Warsaw University in 1954 and continued his studies at the University of Strasbourg in 1961. For some 40 years afterwards, he served as a lecturer at his alma mater in the Faculty of Journalism and Political Science between 1964 and 2004. Kąkolewski himself, became the subject of a TV documentary produced by Telewizja Polska as well as biography written by Marta Sieciechowicz and published in 2009 by Von Borowiecky publishing house as Potwór z Saskiej Kępy (Hellion of Saska Kępa), . He was the author of over 30 non-fiction books with the total circulation of 1.5 million copies, and the recipient of numerous national awards and honours.

Life
Kąkolewski was born in Suchedniów near Warsaw, nine years before invasion of Poland by Nazi Germany and the Soviet Union. His father was a lawyer, killed during the Siege of Warsaw in 1939. Kąkolewski published his first novella at the age of 48, after nearly three decades of often controversial (from the communist standpoint), but highly popular non-fiction works about events in Poland's postwar history. He interviewed former Nazi criminals living safely in Western Germany, e.g. Hans Fleischhacker, Heinz Reinefarth, subsequently described in his book Co u pana słychać? published in 1975, 1978, and 1981. His criminal novel based on authentic MO police records Zbrodniarz, który ukradł zbrodnię was filmed in 1969, as one of the best Polish movies of the time, starring Zygmunt Hübner and Barbara Brylska. Kąkolewski wrote an entire book about the seminal postwar novel Ashes and Diamonds written by Jerzy Andrzejewski and filmed by Andrzej Wajda. He also wrote a monograph about Stalinist terror in the Kielce region, leading to Kielce pogrom of 1946 in postwar Poland.

Books by Krzysztof Kąkolewski

 , Iskry, Warszawa 1959
 , Iskry, Warszawa 1960
 , MON, Warszawa 1960
 , Iskry, Warszawa 1964
 , Iskry, Warszawa 1965
 , Iskry, Warszawa 1966
 , Iskry, Warszawa 1967
 , Iskry, Warszawa 1969
 , Biuro Wyd. Ruch, Warszawa 1971
  (about Sharon Tate and Roman Polański), Iskry, Warszawa 1973
 , Czytelnik, Warszawa 1973
 , Czytelnik, Warszawa 1975
 , Iskry, Warszawa 1976
 , Wydawnictwo Literackie, Kraków 1978
 , Czytelnik, Warszawa 1981
 , KiW, Warszawa 1982
 , Wydawnictwo Literackie, Kraków 1983
 , cz.1 – 1984, cz.2 – 1985, Iskry, Warszawa
 , cz.1 – 1985
 , Wydawnictwo Literackie, Kraków 1987
 , KiW, Warszawa 1988
 , Polonia, Warszawa 1989
  cz. 2 – 1991
 , Słowo, Warszawa 1993
 , Trio, Warszawa 1995
  (about the Kielce pogrom), von borowiecky, Warszawa 1996
 , von borowiecky, Warszawa 1997
 , von borowiecky, Warszawa 2000
 , cz. 1, von borowiecky, Warszawa 2000
  (about the murder of Jerzy Popiełuszko), von borowiecky, Warszawa 2004
 , von borowiecky, Warszawa 2004
 , Miniatura, Kraków 2004
 . cz.2, von borowiecky, Warszawa 2005
 , Zysk i S-ka, Warszawa 2012

References

External links

1930 births
2015 deaths
20th-century Polish journalists
21st-century Polish journalists
Polish male writers
Polish screenwriters